Eoin Duffy (1983, Tullow Ireland) is an Irish director of animation now living and working in Vancouver, British Columbia, Canada. Eoin has created a body of independent work that has gone on to secure multiple accolades including three Oscar accredited festival wins, a nomination for the 2014 European Film Awards a shortlisting for the 86th Academy Awards, and a nomination at the 5th Canadian Screen Awards.

Filmography 
On Departure (2012, 5 min)
The Missing Scarf (2013, 6 min)
I Am Here (2016)

Accolades

References

External links
Eoin Duffy's Website

Irish film directors
1983 births
Living people
People from County Carlow
Irish animators
Irish expatriates in Canada
Irish animated film directors
Canadian animated film directors